The Roseau Valley Juniors or more commonly, R.V. Juniors, are a Lucian football club based in the Anse la Raye Quarter. The club currently plays in the SLFA First Division, the top tier of Saint Lucian football.

References

External links 
RV Juniors

Football clubs in Saint Lucia
Association football clubs established in 2001
2001 establishments in Saint Lucia